Death Panel is a leftist podcast focusing on the political economy of health. It was founded in November 2018 by Artie Vierkant, Beatrice Adler-Bolton, Vince Patti, and Phil Rocco. As of 2021, all of the podcast's founders, except for Patti, remain its co-hosts. Adler-Bolton and Vierkant are both artists, and much of the original inspiration for the podcast came from Adler-Bolton's own experiences interacting with the health care system of the United States as someone with two rare diseases: chronic relapsing inflammatory optic neuropathy and granulomatosis with polyangiitis.

In May 2020, Kerry Doran wrote in ARTnews that "...The Death Panel has become a cult hit in the art world. Artists Ed Atkins, Ivana Bašić, Hannah Black, Joshua Citarella, Simon Denny, Devin Kenny, Cole Lu, Jayson Musson, and Andrew Ross are among some of the devoted listeners." The podcast is funded by a Patreon.

References

External links

2018 podcast debuts
Political podcasts
Audio podcasts
American podcasts